The Abacus Institute of Engineering and Management or AIEM is an undergraduate engineering college in West Bengal, India. It was established in 2008 under a joint venture of JIS and Techno India Group. The college is affiliated with Maulana Abul Kalam Azad University of Technology and all the programmes are approved by the All India Council for Technical Education.

The campus is located at Natungram, Magra, Hooghly. 

Five Btech courses and three diploma courses are offered.

Courses

Btech in
CSE 
ECE
EE
ME
Civil

Diploma courses
CST (COMMUNICATION AND COMPUTER NETWORKING)
ME (MECHATRONICS)
CIVIL (CONSTRUCTION AUTOMATION)

References

External links

Educational institutions established in 2008
2008 establishments in West Bengal
Colleges affiliated to West Bengal University of Technology
Universities and colleges in Hooghly district